Cameron Mesirow (born 1983 or 1984), known professionally as Glasser, is an American singer, songwriter, and record producer signed to True Panther Sounds. She released her debut EP, Apply, on May 26, 2009, followed by debut studio album Ring on September 24, 2010. Her second studio album, Interiors, was released on October 4, 2013.

Early life
Mesirow was born in Boston, Massachusetts. Her father is a member of the Blue Man Group in Berlin, and her mother, Casey Cameron, is one of the founders of new wave band Human Sexual Response. Following her parents' divorce, she relocated to the San Francisco Bay Area at age ten. She had some piano lessons as a child, and performed in musicals at school. Mesirow eventually studied German and literature at San Francisco State University, where she met Foreign Born singer Matt Popieluch, who helped draw out her songwriting abilities.

Career 
According to Mesirow, the name "Glasser" was inspired by "a midnight vision of a figure hovering over water".

In early 2009, Glasser's track "Apply" was featured on the eMusic compilation Selected + Collected and the song was later described by Pitchfork as "one of the disc's standouts [...] a great mix of electronic drag and skyward pop [that] showcased Mesirow's impressive vocal range."

In May 2009, Glasser played her first show without prerecorded parts, in support of her first EP, Apply. At that point Mesirow and Popieluch were living in the Los Feliz neighborhood of Los Angeles and the act was described as "LA-based."  Mesirow was at the time working in the studio of artist Mike Kelley. Glasser's live shows featured performances by the dance troupe Body City and Mesirow wore custom outfits by local designer Ida Falck Øien. According to the LA Weekly, "'Apply' and its sister songs — the swooning 'Learn,' haunted shuffler 'Glad' or the Kate Bush–meets-Cluster 'Tremel' — do sport the built-in intimacy common to good bedroom recordings, but they also possess hints of grandiose and mercurial qualities."

The Apply EP was followed over a year later by Glasser's first full-length studio album, Ring, co-produced by Swedish producer Van Rivers and the Subliminal Kid. According to Pitchfork, "there isn't an easy descriptor for Glasser's sound-- she incorporates bits of tropical pop, tribal percussion, and a couple of different strains of electronic music. Her songs sidestep traditionally linear arrangements for a more open, circular approach-- they kind of swoosh around without pausing at verse-chorus intersections."

Glasser's second album, Interiors, came out in 2013. The album was inspired, according to Mesirow, by Dutch architect and theorist Rem Koolhaas' 1978 book Delirious New York. The album's themes and sounds reflected the artist's move from Los Angeles to downtown Manhattan. "The interiors Glasser explores," wrote Pitchfork, "most compellingly are, it won't surprise you at this point to learn, the ones within human beings. She applies the same ruthless precision to these ostensibly messier subjects, so that video selection "Design", an examination of physical desire that wields human breaths as percussion, is crystalline enough for a posh gallery. But the insides of people turn out to be at least as unknowable as those of buildings."

In 2018, Glasser resurfaced with the self-released, experimental EP Sextape, featuring spoken word descriptions of a variety of sexual experiences over danceable beats. Pitchfork commended the project for engaging "directly with the thorniness of queer intimacy, the complications that arise when queer people seek each other out to dance, to flirt, and to fuck each other."

In 2022, Glasser again resurfaced with a single titled New Scars, released on One Little Independent Records.

Style
Glasser has been compared to Joni Mitchell, Björk and Cocteau Twins.

Discography

Studio albums

Extended plays

References

External links
 

1980s births
21st-century American singers
21st-century American women singers
American women singer-songwriters
Record producers from California
American synth-pop musicians
Living people
Musicians from Boston
Singers from Los Angeles
Year of birth uncertain
American women record producers
Singer-songwriters from California
Singer-songwriters from Massachusetts